Protestantism in Laos is roughly half of the Christian population of the country, the Christian population counting 150,000 people. Most of the Protestants in Laos are part of the Lao Evangelical Church. With around 300 congregations, Protestantism grew rapidly between 1994 and 2004.

History 
The first Protestants in Laos arrived at the start of the twentieth century, specifically in 1903 for South and 1929 for North. However, none became firmly established until after independence in 1954 and then after European and American origin-denominations arrived.

Denominations 
The Lao Evangelical Church is one of the Holiness churches of Laos and has branches in most of provinces across Laos. Another denomination is Seventh-day Adventist church of Laos which was founded in 1973 There are many neo-Protestant groups in Laos with missionary actions are strongest towards minority groups, many of which refuse to take part in everyday society.

The Mission Évangélique au Laos (MEL) is one of the largest Christian denominations of Laos. The MEL is a Christian Brethren church. Most members of the MEL belong to ethnic minorities of the South of Laos, and membership exceeds 10,000.

US Accusations 
According to the US government, there have been instances of the Laotian government attempting to make Christians renounce their faith, and have several times closed down Christian churches. They also say that there are two religious prisoners in Laos, both members of the Lao Evangelical Church and that, in 2005, a church in Savannakhet Province was closed down by the government. Lao officials consider this slander, denying that they have closed any churches and saying that those Christians imprisoned are not imprisoned because of their religion but for other reasons.

See also
 Christianity in Laos

References

Bibliography 
 
 

Christianity in Laos
Laos